Ibrahim Bohari (born 21 January 1978) is a retired Central African Republic football striker.

References

1978 births
Living people
Central African Republic footballers
R.E. Mouscron players
Altay S.K. footballers
K.V. Kortrijk players
K.R.C. Zuid-West-Vlaanderen players
Association football forwards
Belgian Pro League players
Central African Republic expatriate footballers
Expatriate footballers in Belgium
Central African Republic expatriate sportspeople in Belgium
Expatriate footballers in Turkey
Central African Republic expatriate sportspeople in Turkey